Man and Boy is a 2002 British television drama film made for the BBC and directed by Simon Curtis and starring Ioan Gruffudd, Elizabeth Mitchell and Natasha Little. It was based on the 1999 novel Man and Boy by Tony Parsons.

Plot summary
After a man becomes involved in a brief affair his wife decides to leave him and he is left to bring up their young son by himself.

Main cast
 Ioan Gruffudd - Harry Silver
 Elizabeth Mitchell - Cyd Mason
 Natasha Little - Gina Silver
 Ian McNeice - Nigel Batty
 Pauline Collins - Betty Silver
 Dominic Howell - Pat Silver
 Jack Shepherd - Paddy Silver
 Ian McShane - Marty McMann

References

External links

2002 television films
2002 films
Films based on British novels
Films directed by Simon Curtis
2000s English-language films
2000s British films
British drama television films